Arizona v. Gant, 556 U.S. 332 (2009), was a United States Supreme Court decision holding that the Fourth Amendment to the United States Constitution requires law enforcement officers to demonstrate an actual and continuing threat to their safety posed by an arrestee, or a need to preserve evidence related to the crime of arrest from tampering by the arrestee, in order to justify a warrantless vehicular search incident to arrest conducted after the vehicle's recent occupants have been arrested and secured.

Background
The case involved Rodney J. Gant, who was arrested by Tucson, Arizona, police on an outstanding warrant for driving with a suspended driver’s license. Police arrested Gant in a friend's yard after he had parked his vehicle and was walking away. Gant and all other suspects on the scene were then secured in police patrol cars. The officers then searched Gant's vehicle. After finding a weapon and a bag of cocaine, they also charged him with possession of a narcotic drug for sale and possession of drug paraphernalia.

Arguments before the Court
Thomas Frank Jacobs (Tucson, Arizona), lead counsel for Rodney Gant, argued the case before the U.S. Supreme Court on October 7, 2008. Jacobs argued that an unreasonable expansion of a limited authority to search vehicles incident to arrest provided by the Supreme Court's 1981 decision in New York v. Belton was occurring. Lower courts were allowing searches after the initial justifications for setting aside the Fourth Amendment's warrant requirement had ceased to exist, relying on a so-called bright-line rule of "if arrest, then search." Jacobs argued, and the Court ultimately agreed, that such application of the Belton exception caused the exception to "swallow the rule," allowing unconstitutional searches.

Amici curiae
A group of legal scholars, including University of Iowa law professor James Tomkovicz, wrote an amicus curiae brief asking the court to overturn the 1981 case, New York v. Belton, that granted police the authority to search a person's vehicle even if that person is not in the vehicle. According to Tomkovicz, Belton failed to meet the constitutional standard of probable cause.

Opinion of the Court
In an opinion delivered by Justice Stevens, the Supreme Court held that police may search the passenger compartment of a vehicle, incident to a recent occupant's arrest (and therefore without a warrant) only if it is reasonable to believe that the arrestee might access the vehicle at the time of the search, or that the vehicle contains evidence of the offense of arrest.

Justice Scalia wrote a concurring opinion, stating that "we should simply abandon the Belton-Thornton charade of officer safety and overrule those cases. I would hold that a vehicle search incident to arrest is ipso facto 'reasonable' only when the object of the search is evidence of the crime for which the arrest was made, or of another crime that the officer has probable cause to believe occurred."

Justice Alito wrote a dissent joined by Chief Justice Roberts, Justice Kennedy, and Justice Breyer in part, saying that the court could not overrule New York v. Belton and Thornton v. United States, 541 U. S. 615 (2004).

Justice Breyer wrote a separate dissent.

See also
 List of United States Supreme Court cases
 List of United States Supreme Court cases, volume 556
 Chimel v. California (1969)
 New York v. Belton

References

Further reading
 
 {{cite journal |last=Rudstein |first=David S. |year=2005 |title=Belton Redux: Re-evaluating Belton'''s Per Se Rule Governing the Search of an Automobile Incident to an Arrest |journal=Wake Forest Law Review |volume=40 |pages=1287 |issn=0043-003X }}
 
 
 Berland, David (2011). Note, "Stopping the Pendulum: Why Stare Decisis Should Constrain the Court from Further Modification of the Search Incident to Arrest Exception". University of Illinois Law Review'' 2011: 695.

External links
 
 Arizona v. Gant at ScotusWiki

United States Supreme Court cases
United States Fourth Amendment case law
2009 in United States case law
2009 in Arizona
Legal history of Arizona
History of Tucson, Arizona
United States Supreme Court cases of the Roberts Court